Prignani can refer to:

Francesco Moricotti Prignani (died 1394), Italian Roman Catholic bishop and Cardinal
Pope Urban VI (1318 – 1389), Bartholomew Prignani, Roman Catholic Pope

See also
Prignano (disambiguation)